Liebherr is a German-Swiss multinational equipment manufacturer based in Bulle, Switzerland, with its main production facilities and origins in Germany.

Liebherr consists of over 130 companies organized into 11 divisions: earthmoving, mining, mobile cranes, tower cranes, concrete technology, maritime cranes, aerospace and transportation systems, machine tools and automation systems, domestic appliances, and components. It has a worldwide workforce over 42,000, with nine billion euros in revenue for 2017. By 2007, it was the world's largest crane company.

Established in 1949 by Hans Liebherr in Kirchdorf an der Iller, Baden-Württemberg, Germany, the business is still entirely owned by the Liebherr family. Isolde and Willi Liebherr, Hans' daughter and son, respectively, are the chief executive and chairman of the Bulle, Switzerland–based Liebherr-International AG, and several other family members are actively involved in corporate management. In 2005, Forbes magazine listed them as billionaires. In 1974, the Franklin Institute awarded Hans Liebherr the Frank P. Brown Medal.

History 
Hans Liebherr was drafted for military service in World War II. During the war, Liebherr served with the Ulm Pioneer Battalion 101, which was subordinate to the 101st Light Infantry Division and fought under Army Group South in the German-Soviet War.  After the war, he started by building affordable tower cranes; Liebherr expanded into making aircraft parts—it is a significant supplier to European Airbus airplane manufacturer—and commercial chiller displays and freezers, as well as domestic refrigerators. The group also produces some of the world's biggest mining and digging machinery, including loaders, excavators, and extreme-sized dump trucks. The T 282 B is the world's second-largest truck (after BelAZ 75710). The group's nine-axle mobile crane, the LTM 11200–9.1—with a  telescopic boom—in 2007 received the heavy-lifting industry's Development of the Year award for being the world's most powerful example of such a machine.

Over the years, the family business has grown into a group of varied companies, and has locations in many countries, including Germany, Australia, Britain, Ireland, Turkey, and the United States. Since 1958, its Irish factory in Killarney, County Kerry, has built container cranes, exporting them worldwide through the port of Fenit. In Australia, the group in 2013 commenced an AU$65 million expansion of their local headquarters in Adelaide. The development includes adding a new three-storey office, workshops, warehouse, component plant, and distribution centre to the Para Hills facility. In the U.S., the group in 2012 started spending US$45.4 million (about €34.1 million) on a three-year renovation and expansion of its Newport News, Virginia, factory, offices, and warehouse. The company sought to increase its production there beyond 100 mining trucks a year. On 19 February 2013, representatives from the Commonwealth of Virginia and the cities of Newport News and Hampton announced that they would make grants and incentives available for transport improvement, training, and property investment. In addition, the Liebherr Group owns six hotels in Ireland, Austria and Germany.

In April 2014, Liebherr announced that it would invest €160 million at its production site in Bulle.

By 2017, Liebherr had expanded its workforce to 43,869 employees. That same year, the company announced it had achieved the highest turnover in the Group's history, with sales of €9,845 million. In 2018, Liebherr generated a turnover of €10,551 million, breaking through the €10 billion barrier for the first time in the company's history.

In March 2020, Liebherr launched their first APAC HQ in Singapore, alongside their bespoke $35,000 SGD Bespoke Luxe Refrigerator with the help of PR & Communication specialist Stanley Kan & his team.

Products
The line of products manufactured by the company includes: 
Earth-moving equipment
Mining equipment
Cranes: mobile, crawler, tower, maritime, mobile construction
Diesel engines
Deep foundation machines
Concrete-handling equipment
Material-handling equipment
Electric motors
Port (container-handling) equipment
Machine tools
Automation systems
Domestic refrigerators and freezers
Aircraft equipment
Hotels
Mechanical, hydraulic, electrical, and electronic components and subcomponents

Liebherr has the world's most powerful and tallest crawler crane in its LR 13000. This is achieved with the attachment of an additional  lattice jib to the  main boom.

Gallery

See also

Liebherr Aerospace
Liebherr 2010 World Team Table Tennis Championships
Construction
Crane (machine)
List of companies of Switzerland
List of largest manufacturing companies by revenue

References

External links

Liebherr Machinery database at portvision.eu
Liebherr family behind bid for Southampton FC
Obituary of Markus Liebherr, The Daily Telegraph, 18 August 2010.
Craneception: Watch a Crane Lifting a Crane Lifting a Crane Lifting a Crane

Construction equipment manufacturers of Switzerland
Mining equipment companies
Swiss brands
Home appliance manufacturers of Switzerland
Manufacturing companies established in 1949
Swiss companies established in 1949
Multinational companies headquartered in Switzerland
Aircraft component manufacturers
Crane manufacturers
Aircraft undercarriage manufacturers
Diesel engine manufacturers
Engine manufacturers of Switzerland
1949 establishments in Germany
Machine tool builders
Electric motor manufacturers
Pump manufacturers
Gas engine manufacturers